Rochester and Strood is a constituency in Kent represented in the House of Commons of the UK Parliament since 2015 by Kelly Tolhurst, a Conservative. Since 2022, she has served as Government Deputy Chief Whip and Treasurer of the Household.

Constituency profile
Rochester and Strood constituency is situated alongside the River Medway, which joins the Thames Estuary, becoming a wide salty and sea-like waterway at its northern river mouth. It spans the ancient cathedral city of Rochester, the older part of Chatham, and the smaller town of Strood to the west of the river, with a more rural area to the north of Strood on the Hoo Peninsula.

Earnings in the constituency are close to the national average income, low unemployment compared to the national average (3.5% at the end of 2012) and can be considered aside from significant sources of employment, professions and trades in Kent as part of the London Commuter Belt.  Levels of reliance on social housing are similar to most of the region in this seat.

History
The Rochester constituency has ancient origins dating to the 16th century, but it has seen many changes in the 20th century. From 1885 to 1918 the wider area was split between Chatham, Gillingham and the "old", rural, Medway constituency. The Chatham seat joined Rochester to form Rochester and Chatham in 1950, which formed the core of Medway in 1983.

When the boroughs of Rochester upon Medway and Gillingham merged in 1998 to form, then confusingly, a unitary authority named Medway, the parliamentary constituency of Medway only covered part of the new borough, so in the boundary changes before the 2010 election the seat was renamed to more accurately reflect the area of Rochester and Strood which it now covers.

The seat of Rochester and Chatham, followed by Medway and then Rochester and Strood, had elected members of the party which won the popular vote in the UK at every election since 1959. This had meant that from 1959 to 2014 the area had always been represented by a member of the governing party, apart from the brief period between the February and October elections in 1974 (since Labour formed a minority government in February despite the Conservatives winning the popular vote).

In 2014, the sitting Conservative MP Mark Reckless defected to the United Kingdom Independence Party (UKIP), becoming the second MP in a matter of weeks to do so. Reckless resigned his seat, triggering a by-election in which he stood as the UKIP candidate. He won the by-election by just under 3,000 votes and became UKIP's second MP after Douglas Carswell. At the 2015 general election, Reckless was defeated by Conservative candidate Kelly Tolhurst, who had also fought the by-election. Tolhurst secured a majority of over 7,000 votes, meaning the Rochester area once again had an MP on the government benches.

In 2017, Lily Madigan was elected as Women's Officer for the Labour Party in the constituency, making her the first trans woman to hold the position.

Boundaries

The seat covers the Cuxton and Halling, Peninsula, River, Rochester East, Rochester South and Horsted, Rochester West, Strood North, Strood Rural and Strood South wards of Medway.

Members of Parliament

Elections

Elections in the 2010s

See also
 List of parliamentary constituencies in Kent

Notes

References

External links
 Rochester and Strood on UKPollingReport

Politics of Medway
Parliamentary constituencies in Kent
Constituencies of the Parliament of the United Kingdom established in 2010